Borka, also known as Borka Satgaon, is a large village in Kamalpur tehsil, Kamrup Rural district, Assam, India. It is situated near Changsari and is 30 km distant from Guwahati. the village is at a distance of 5 km form AIIMS guwahati.

Education
Schools and colleges include:
Sankardev Shishu Niketan School
Madhya Kampith College
Borka Satgoan high School
Borka high school
Moonligt Academy 
Sammanay Academy 
Devarshi Vidyapeeth

Pub Kamrup College
Sonapur College, Kamrup

References

Villages in Kamrup district